The 2016 F2000 Championship Series season is the eleventh season of competition for the series.

Canadian Masters Class competitor Steve Bamford won eight of the twelve races he contested and won the championship. He is the second masters class driver to win the championship.

American John McCusker won the penultimate round of the championship to finish second in points. American Masters Class competitor won one race and finished third in points. Other winners were veteran Bob Reid who won the final race of the season, a rain-affected race of only seven laps, and Americans John LaRue and Trent Walko, who each only competed in four races, finishing on the podium in all four, and winning one. Matt McDonough won the first race at Watkins Glen International, the only round he competed in.

The points system allows a driver's two worst races to be "dropped" for season points. Because of this, Dave Weitzenhof was the only driver to compete in all sixteen races of the schedule.

Race calendar and results

Championship standings

References

External links
 Official Series Website

F2000 Championship Series
F2000 Championship Series seasons